Periférico Oriente is a station on Line 12 of the Mexico City Metro. The station is located between Calle 11 and Tezonco. It was opened on 30 October 2012 as a part of the first stretch of Line 12 between Mixcoac and Tláhuac.

The station is located southeast of the city center, at the intersection between Avenida Tlahuac and the Anillo Periférico. It is built above the ground.

The symbol for the station depicts the outline of a prison guard tower, in reference to the nearby Recusorio Oriente prison.

Ridership

References

External links 
 

Periferico Oriente
Railway stations opened in 2012
2012 establishments in Mexico
Mexico City Metro stations in Tláhuac
Accessible Mexico City Metro stations